(November 18, 1922 – February 26, 2002) was a Japanese cross-country skier who competed in the 1950s. He finished 22nd in the 18 km event at the 1952 Winter Olympics in Oslo.

References

Olympic cross-country skiers of Japan
Cross-country skiers at the 1952 Winter Olympics
Japanese male cross-country skiers
2002 deaths
1922 births